The Mercy class of hospital ships are converted San Clemente-class supertankers used by the United States Navy. Originally built in the 1970s by the National Steel and Shipbuilding Company, they were acquired by the Navy and converted into hospital ships, coming into service in 1986 and 1987.

Mercy class replaced the Haven-class hospital ships.

The ships are operated by Military Sealift Command and are designed to provide emergency, on-site care for American combatant forces, and also for use in support of disaster relief and humanitarian operations. Each ship contains twelve fully equipped operating rooms, a 1,000-bed hospital facility, radiological services, a medical laboratory, pharmacy, optometry lab, CT scan equipment, and two oxygen-producing plants.

Ships
Two ships of the class were put into service:

  (ex SS Worth)
  (ex SS Rose City)

Missions 
Stationed in San Diego, California, Mercy primarily operates in the Pacific and Indian Oceans. Her inaugural mission in 1987, was a humanitarian cruise to the Philippines and South Pacific. Her first military mission was serving coalition troops in the First Gulf War. The first disaster relief came in the wake of the 2004 tsunami as Operation Unified Assistance.  Her latest was in 2013, when she came to the aid of the Philippines, and other nations in the aftermath of Typhoon Haiyan.

Stationed out of Norfolk, Virginia, Comfort operates primarily in the Caribbean and Latin America. Her first mission was a combat one: serving coalition troops off the coast of Kuwait, during Operation Desert Storm. Her first humanitarian missions both happened in 1994, helping Haitian and Cuban immigrants looking to come to America. In the aftermath of 9/11, Comfort was activated and sent to Manhattan, to provide medical and mental health services. Comfort headed into combat again for Operation Iraqi Freedom. In 2005, she was back saving American citizens following the devastation of Hurricane Katrina.  In 2010, she undertook another disaster relief mission, in response to an earthquake in Haiti. In May 2015, Comfort was in Kingston, Jamaica, providing medical services including optometry, dentistry, general medical, women’s health, pediatrics, and pharmacy. The Jamaica leg was part of ‘Continuing Promise’, a nearly six-month humanitarian mission across the Caribbean region. Once again in 2017, Comfort was deployed to aid American citizens in Puerto Rico after Hurricane Maria.

In March 2020, the ships were deployed to aid in the fight against the coronavirus pandemic. Both ships will function as trauma centers at currently-disused cruise ship terminals in San Pedro and Manhattan. This will enable nearby hospitals to free up beds for coronavirus patients. On April 21st, Governor Cuomo told President Trump that Comfort was no longer needed in New York. While docked in the city, she treated 182 patients.

Criticism
The Mercy-class ships are large, with 1,000 beds, and can receive up to 200 patients a day. They are stable platforms suitable for performing most surgical procedures in various sea conditions. However, the main points of criticism of these ships are:

 They are too slow, with a maximum speed of just over 17 knots. The Mercy class ships are much larger (in terms of medical capacity) than is needed for most military operations, and they are not easily or quickly deployed or docked. Their size gives them a substantial radar signature that, combined with lack of maneuverability, makes them vulnerable to attack. In theory, this should never occur, as attacking a hospital ship is a war crime under the Hague Convention of 1907, but the ships are left vulnerable to terrorist organizations and other entities that do not follow such established warfare conventions, due to the fact that both ships are outfitted only with defensive weapons.
 While the ships are underway or in rough seas patients must be transported by helicopter. However, helicopter capacities are limited, as each ship has only one landing pad.
 Patient movement within the ship is limited. Built as oil tankers, the original oil storage bulkheads were retained, but have no doors, which means that patients must be brought up to the top deck in order to be moved from a lower compartment in one part of the ship to another.

In mid-2004 Vice Admiral Michael L. Cowan, the Surgeon General and chief of the Bureau of Medicine and Surgery, said that Comfort and Mercy should be retired. "They're wonderful ships, but they're dinosaurs. They were designed in the '70s, built in the '80s, and frankly, they're obsolete".

See also
List of United States Navy hospital ships

References

External links

 
Auxiliary ship classes of the United States Navy